The 1950–51 international cricket season was from September 1950 to April 1951.

Season overview

November

Commonwealth in India

December

England in Australia

February

Commonwealth in Ceylon

March

England in New Zealand

References

International cricket competitions by season
1950 in cricket
1951 in cricket